Moussa Traoré (born 10 April 1990) is a professional footballer who plays as a forward for Rebecq. Born in Ivory Coast, he has represented Burkina Faso internationally.

Career
Traoré began his career with Commune FC and was loaned out to Planète Champion in the 2008–09 season. He was loaned out on 2 July 2009 from Commune FC to Belgian top club Standard Liège, with one-year-loan deal plus a sell option. After his return to Commune FC, Standard pulled the sold option, and loaned him one day later for one season to SV Zulte Waregem.

On 6 November 2019, Traoré joined RWDM47 on a deal for the rest of the season.

Personal life
The Ivorian-born Traoré holds a Burkinabé passport.

Honours
 Standard Liège
 Belgian Super Cup: 2009

References

External links
 

1990 births
Living people
Ivorian footballers
Citizens of Burkina Faso through descent
Burkinabé footballers
Association football forwards
Ivorian people of Burkinabé descent
Sportspeople of Burkinabé descent
Commune FC players
Planète Champion players
Standard Liège players
S.V. Zulte Waregem players
RWS Bruxelles players
Siah Jamegan players
A.F.C. Tubize players
RWDM47 players
Belgian Pro League players
Challenger Pro League players
Persian Gulf Pro League players
Belgian Third Division players
Burkina Faso international footballers
Ivorian expatriate footballers
Burkinabé expatriate footballers
Expatriate footballers in Belgium
Expatriate footballers in Iran
Ivorian expatriate sportspeople in Belgium
Ivorian expatriate sportspeople in Iran
Burkinabé expatriate sportspeople in Belgium
Burkinabé expatriate sportspeople in Iran
Footballers from Abidjan
R.U.S. Rebecquoise players